Banshkhali is an upazila (administrative region) of Chattogram District in Chattogram Division, Bangladesh.

Geography
Its neighbouring upazilas are Anwara and Sangu to the north, Chakaria to the south, Lohagara and Satkania to the east, and Kutubdia and the Bay of Bengal to the west. Through it runs a canal named "Shonaichari at Banshkhali" which is locally known as “Honaichari.” In the past, businessmen from Chakaria bought bamboo here and used the Shonaichari Canal to transport the bamboo to other areas. At that time, local people observed that the Shonaichari Canal was filled with bamboo. Banshkhali is named after this historical event. It has 55,609 households and a total area of 376.9 km2.

Demographics
As of the 2011 Bangladesh census, Banshkhali had a population of 427,913. Males constituted 224,697 the population, and females 203,216. Among the population, 87% are Muslim, 11% are Hindu, and 1% are Christian and other.

Places of interest
Chandpur-Boilgaon Tea Estate, Pukuria
Banshkhali Eco Park
Baamer Chara
Sea Beach (Baharchhara Point, Khankhanabadh Point, Kadamrasul Point)
Shangu River
Bokshi Hamid Mosque
Khan Bahadur Jame Masjid, Boilchari
Shafor Alli Munsi Bredge, Sadhanpur
British Kaman. Upazila Board Office, Sadhanpur
Hazi Rafiq Uddin Road, Neazor Para, Jaldi
Ramkrisna Mission, Dakshin Jaldi

Administration
Banshkhali Upazila is divided into Banshkhali Municipality and 14 union parishads: Baharchhara, Bailchhari, Chambal, Chhanua, Gandamara, Kalipur, Katharia, Khankhanabad, Puichhari, Pukuria, Sadhanpur, Saral, Sekherkhil, and Silkup. The union parishads are subdivided into 72 mauzas and 81 villages.

Banshkhali Municipality is subdivided into 9 wards and 38 mahallas.

Villages 

 1No. Pukuria Union villages: Pukuria, Chanpur, Chandpur, Hajigaon, Natmura, and South Borumchara.
 4 No. Baharchhara Union villages: Chapachari<Post Office>, Ilsha, Baharchhara, Baskala, Roatnapur, Satdigirpara, Maijpara, Haliapara.
 3 no Khankhanabad Union Village's name:- Kadam Rasu<Post Office> Khankhanabad, Kadam Rasul, Premasia, Raichata, Dongra, Digirpara.
 5 No. Kalipur<Post Office> "Izzat Nogar": "There is a Sub Register Office in this area"
 11 No. Puichari Union

Education
There are 412 primary schools, 39 high schools, 66 madrassas, and 8 colleges.

Secondary schools
Saral Amiria High School(saral-1967)
Bailchari Nazmunessa High School (Bailchari Kb Bazar -1952)
 Kokdandi Gunagari High School, Kokdandi
 West Banshkali High School & College (1957), Chapachari
 Kamal Uddin Chy Girls High School (2005). Chapachari. 
 Natmura Pukuria High School, Pukuria
 Banskhali Pilot High School, Joldi
 Katharia Bagmara High School, Katharia
 Banigram Sadhonpur High School (1917), Banigram
 Azaharul Huq High School (1943), Kalipur
 Khankhanabadh Ideal High School, Khankhanabadh
 Monaem Shah Awlia High School, South Borumchara 
 Hazigoan Borumchara High School (1966), Hazigoan
 Joldi Piolot High School (1932), Joldi
 Sadhonpur Girl's High School
 Azaharul Huq High School (1942), Kalipur
 B B Chowdhary High School (1975), Raichata
 Sadhanpur Polly Unniyon High School, West Sadhanpur
 Baharchara Ratnapur High School (1985)
 Napora Shekherkhil High School (1964)
 Puichari izzatia ideal high school
 Chambal High School , Chambal (1946)
 Banskhali Bangabandhu High School
 Raichatta Premasia Adhorsho High School

Colleges
 Banshkhli Degree College (1967), Gunagori
 West Banshkhli Upokulio Degree College (1995), Chapachari
 West Banskhali High School & College (2021) Chapachari.
 Alawl Degree College (1973), Joldi
 Mtr. N. Ahd. College, Napora
 Banshkhli Mohila College, Boilchari
 Banshkhali Public School & College, Jaldi Miar Baza
Hazigoan Borumchara School & College (only intermediate)

Madrasas
 Banskhali Hamedia Rahima Alia Madrasa (1974), Chechuria
 Chapachari Abu Bakkar (R) Islamia Madrasa. Middle Chaparani. 
 Chandpur Q.H.R.D.U. Alim Madrasah (1963), Pukuria Union
 South Sadhanpur Jumhuriya Islamia Boys & Girl Madrasah (1970) West Banskhali Darul Islah Dakhil Madrasah(1992)
jaldhi hosainia kamil madrasah(1947)

Notable residents
 Freedom Fighter and Ex. Member of Parliament Mokhtar Ahmad -Shadhanpur
 Zakirul Hoque Chowdhury-Union President and Chairman (1950-1973), Member Of  Provincial Assembly (1962, 1965). Governor-Designate for Chattogram(south) district. Founding President Of Chattogram South District Awami league
Samarendra Lal Dey, Havildar of East Pakistan Rifles, freedom fighter and martyr.
Deputy Shah Mohammad Badiul Alam; (1856-1931), Writer of "What is man'' which is included as a academic book and studied in American and England Universities. 
Professor Abdul Karim- Historian(1928-2007) Student and Professor of University of Dhaka. He was 5th vice Chancellor of University of Chattagram. He is awarded Ekushey Padak.

See also
 Banshkhali power plant movement
Banshkhali carnage

References

Banshkhali Upazila